, also known as simply Next Dimension, is a Japanese manga series written and illustrated by Masami Kurumada. It is the canonical sequel to, while also serving as a prequel to the Saint Seiya manga by Kurumada. The main plot is set in the 18th century during the previous "Holy War" between the goddess Athena and the god Hades, and centres on the battles between each deity's  warriors who are known as the Saints and the Specters respectively. It is published by Akita Shoten in the weekly magazine Weekly Shōnen Champion at irregular dates. It is also known by its alternate subtitle , which is used during publication to refer to the segments of the storyline set in the 20th century, as opposed to the Myth of Hades subtitle, which refers to the segments set in the 18th century. 

Unlike the original work, Next Dimension is published in full color in its volume compilations, with the printed chapters in the Shōnen Champion magazine originally published in the standard black and white format of Japanese comics media; with occasional color pages. However, the digital version of the chapters is published in color, albeit in a simplified color scheme that is later improved and enhanced in the compilations. Thus, Next Dimension is notable as one of the few titles of the genre to be published in full color today.

Plot
Next Dimension resumes the story of Kurumada's original Saint Seiya manga by means of a flashback to the final battle of the Saints of Athena in the Hades arc. During the battle, Hades, the god of the Underworld recognizes Seiya as the feared enemy he faced millennia ago, in the ages of myth, reincarnated in this era. The god is reminded of past incarnations and then reminisces about the events that occurred in the last war between Athena and himself 243 years earlier. During that era, a boy named Tenma was one of Athena's legendary warriors, the Saints. He was also the incarnation of Pegasus Seiya in the 18th century. Tenma was best friends with a boy named Alone, Hades' chosen vessel to inhabit in that era. As Alone became possessed by Hades, Tenma ventures to rescue him, meeting Aries Shion and Libra Dohko and eventually suffering defeat at the hands of two of the Magnates from the Underworld. Surviving the encounter, the Saints return to Athena's Sanctuary to devise a strategy to prevent Hades from completing his machinations. 

In the present time, Pegasus Seiya is under a curse from Hades that will kill him in three days. Athena decides to save Seiya and is accompanied by the Saint, Andromeda Shun. They travel back in time with the aid of Chronos, but are sent further back than intended so that they end up during the previous holy war. They are separated and Athena is turned into a baby, but she is saved from harm by a Saint as it turns out the leader of the Sanctuary is in league with Hades. 

Tenma meet Shun and is convinced of the situation and they race to rescue Athena. On their way through the twelve houses of the Zodiac the meet and fight against several of the powerful Gold Saints and also Specters, warriors of Hades. They are also joined by Shun's comrades, Ikki, Shiryu and Hyoga. Another looming threat is revealed to be coming in the form of the 13th Gold Saint of Ophiuchus.

Characters

The following are some of the characters that have a prominent role in the chapters released to date. As the story progresses, some more characters have been introduced, and are expected to be developed further in future chapters.

 Pegasus Tenma: The 18th century incarnation of Pegasus Seiya and the main character of the story.
 Alone: The purest soul in the 18th century and the previous human vessel for Hades, god of the Underworld. A young painter apprentice who is an orphan and a close friend to Tenma.
 Aries Shion: A former Bronze Saint promoted to Gold Saint of Aries, future Pope of Sanctuary.
 Libra Dohko: A former Bronze Saint promoted to Gold Saint of Libra, future master of Dragon Shiryū.
 Crateris Suikyō: Formerly the Crateris Silver Saint, master of Tenma and a well-respected soldier of Athena's army. Unknown events have led him to switch his loyalty to Hades, forsaking his destiny as a Saint and embracing a new one as the Garuda Specter in Hades' army. He also trained with Shion and Dohko during their childhood.
 Andromeda Shun: One of the main characters, he travels back to the past with Saori and is later separated from her in the 18th century. In the same way as Alone was in the 18th century, Shun is the human with the purest soul in the present.
 Phoenix Ikki: Another of the protagonists and brother of Shun, he reappears fighting off LaScomoune before leaving and travelling to the past.
 Dragon Shiryū: Another of the protagonists, Shiryū goes back in time, to the time of the previous Holy War against Hades in the eighteenth century, to help Saori / Athena to save the life of Seiya.
 Cygnus Hyōga: Another of the protagonists, who back in time with Shiryū, at the time of the holy war against Hades in the eighteenth century, to help Athena.
 Saori Kido: She is the current incarnation of Athena, the greek goddess of justice and heroic endeavor. She, along with Shun, travels back to the holy war against Hades in the 18th century to revert Hades' curse on Seiya, but was turned into an infant by Chronos, the god of time.
Ophiuchus Odysseus: Originally a Silver Saint, endowed with miraculous healing abilities, he was beloved and well respected in Sanctuary, where his tragic passing was heavily mourned in the 18th century. Years later, he is resurrected as the legendary Ophiuchus Gold Saint, who was cursed and sealed away in the ages of myth. Odysseus is presented by Kurumada in an antagonistic role.
Angel Tōma: Formerly an Angel, a combatant of the Heavenly Realm, imprisoned in the Lunar Prison due to sins of his past. His status as an Angel is restored by Callisto, who sends him to take Athena's life, as well as Seiya's. His past is mysteriously connected to Eagle Marin.
 Pegasus Seiya: The main character of the story. After the battle against Hades, he remains between life and death from the god's cursed sword. For that reason, Athena and his Saint friends embark on a journey back in time to save him.

Production

Masami Kurumada first announced the start of the follow-up to his famous Saint Seiya series in 2006. On April 21 he posted an image of Hades, Lord of the Underworld, on his blog.
Short chapters came to be published once or even twice per month due to its sporadic release until January 4, 2007 when the next chapter did not get released until August 2, 2007. The series have kept up sporadic releases, with brief intervals of week-to-week publication, but Masami Kurumada updates his blog after a longer interval to show the next upcoming chapters. In Volume 2, in his personal message, Masami Kurumada apologies for the delay of the second volume; revealing that he was sick for a long time in the spring of 2009.

Saint Seiya: Next Dimension was conceived by Masami Kurumada as a prequel to his Saint Seiya manga, parting from elements revealed in it but never further developed and explored then, hence, he started writing and drawing Next Dimension by opening the storyline in a prologue, with a flashback to the last battle of his original manga, contained in vol. 28. Additionally, the original concept of the prequel was to work simultaneously with Shiori Teshirogi's Saint Seiya : The Lost Canvas as a multi-angle interpretation of the storyline, but this approach was quickly abandoned, as both works greatly diverged. At the release of the first collected volume (tankōbon) of the series, Next Dimension was confirmed to be canonical within the universe and chronology conceived by Kurumada for Saint Seiya.

Following Masami Kurumada's traditional writing and drawing style, the storyline unfolds in typical shōnen manga narrative. In addition each chapter is presented in full colour. The first chapter was initially called Prologue ①, however, the "①" was removed in the collected first volume. During the first 14 chapters, the borderline of the pages was coloured to look like a starlit night sky, this was changed to standard white in part 14 and further chapters as well as a standard in compiled volumes. Parts 15 and 16 were published in a black & white format complemented by one colour image each. The following parts have continued being released in black & white accompanied by various colored pages. The parts published in black and white will be available in full colour in their respective volume compilation. Certain objects and pieces of information that was previously published in the Saint Seiya Encyclopedia are used in the story such as one of Athena's 88 armours, the Crateris Silver Cloth, albeith with a new design.

Media
A prologue, 102 chapters, and two additional special chapters have been released to date since 2006, and are being collectively published in tankōbon form. The twelfth compilation was released on May 8, 2018.
The first special episode for Next Dimension was published on June 19, 2014 to commemorate the release of the animated film Saint Seiya: Legend of Sanctuary. The second special chapter was released a year after on July 16, 2015. Both special chapters were compiled in the tenth volume.

Volume list

Chapters not yet in tankōbon format
, published on June 3, 2021.
, published on June 10, 2021.
, published on June 17, 2021.
, published on June 24, 2021.
, published on July 1, 2021.
, published on July 8, 2021.
, published on July 15, 2021.

Reception
 During its first week, the first volume of the manga sold 30,618 copies in Japan and stood on the 22nd place of most sold in February 2009. The following week it had sold 57,426 copies, but had gone down to 27th place of most sold that month. 
 After its first week the second volume lay on 9th place of most bought manga volume of march in Japan. 
 During its first week, the third volume of the manga sold 44,200 copies in Japan and stood on the 17th place of most sold in December 2010
 During its first week, the fourth volume of the manga ranked at the 8th place of the 30 most sold titles in December 2011, according to Comiclist.jp. Also, according to the same source, the fourth volume of Next Dimension ranked 6th in the 10 most sold shōnen manga in December 2011. 
 Oricon.jp ranked the fifth volume of Next Dimension in the 23rd place out of the 30 most sold titles, in its first week of sales.
 During its first week, the sixth volume of the manga sold 61,525 copies in Japan and stood on the 30th place of most sold manga in December 2012. 
 (No data)
 During its first week, the eighth volume of the manga sold 62,500 copies in Japan and stood on the 28th place of most sold manga in December 2013 
 During its first 3 days, the ninth volume sold approximately 40,000 copies, coming in 7th place among the top selling Shōnen manga in Japan; 67.215 copies sold in the first 12 days. 
 In Japan, the tenth volume of Saint Seiya: Next Dimension has sold 46,000 copies in its first week, reaching the 19th position of the best-selling manga of the week.
In Japan, the eleventh volume has sold 54,922 copies in the ten day period from its day of release to September 17, 2017, ranking #44 on the list of the 50 most sold titles of Oricon.jp 
 The volume 12 of Saint Seiya: Next Dimension in Japan reached the 10th position of the best-selling manga in Japan in the first week with 46,649 copies sold.

Merchandise
As of September 2017, merchandise related to Saint Seiya: Next Dimension is still uncommon. Aside from the tankobōbon compilations, only a few promotional cards have been published, included in the Champion magazine issues. The cards feature selected characters from the Saint Seiya universe illustrated by the author Kurumada and occasionally a message from him and his signature. In addition, numerous promotional posters with illustrations from the series have been released together with several of the publications. A skin for the interchangeable protective cover of the Iphone 5 was released in June 2014 with an image of Athena and Seiya.

In a message included in the issue of publication of chapter 84 of Next Dimension, Masami Kurumada teases the release of a collectible figure of Ophiuchus Odysseus in the near future.

On september 20th, 2017, it was revealed in the Tamashii Nations website, that the collectible figure mentioned by Kurumada is a special release and part of the Cloth Myth EX line, and it will be indeed a figure of the Ophiuchus Gold Saint, to be released in the Original Color Edition format, creator Kurumada was involved in the development of the figure as supervisor, although, the figure is not modeled in Odysseus' likeness, as it is meant to represent the image of the Ophiuchus Gold Saint from legend and not Odysseus or Asclepios specifically. Based in Kurumada's original design from his manga and not from an anime adaptation as is usual for the line;  the figure is the first collectible figure ever released from Next Dimension and of the character as well.

Video game
A song for Next Dimension titled "END OR NEXT", was composed, for the Saint Seiya: Awakening mobile video game from Tencent, with vocals by Nobuo Yamada, the original singer of Pegasus Fantasy. Ophiuchus Odysseus is also featured as a character in the game, voiced by Yuichi Nakamura, as well as Virgo Shijima.

Events 
For the event of the 50th anniversary of the Weekly Shōnen Champion magazine, the Ophiuchus Gold Cloth was recreated on a 1:1 scale, about 6' 8" tall; also a gallery showcased several art pieces authored by Masami Kurumada and taken from Next Dimension and collectible figures of the Ophiuchus Gold Saint.

References

External links
 Masami Kurumada's Official Website (Japanese)
 Akita Shoten official website (Japanese)
 

2006 manga
Akita Shoten manga
Classical mythology in popular culture
Next Dimension
Shōnen manga